Smallwood may refer to:

People
 Denis Smallwood (1918–1997), British RAF commander
 Ed Smallwood (1937–2002), American basketball player
 E. Mary Smallwood (born 1919), classical historian
 Fred Smallwood (1910–1965), Welsh footballer
 Gerald Smallwood (1889–1977), British Army general
 Joey Smallwood (1900–1991), Canadian politician
 Jonathan Smallwood (born 1975), British psychologist
 Kathy Smallwood-Cook (born 1960), British sprinter
 Neil Smallwood (born 1966), English professional footballer
 Richard Smallwood (musician) (born 1948), American gospel music artist
 Richard Smallwood (footballer) (born 1990), English footballer
 Rod Smallwood (medical engineer) (born 1945), British medical engineer
 Rod Smallwood (born 1950), English music manager
 Tom Smallwood (born 1977), American ten-pin bowler
 Walt Smallwood (1893–1967), baseball player
 Wendell Smallwood (born 1994), American football player
 William Smallwood (1732–1792), American general and politician
 Yawin Smallwood (born 1991), American football player

Places
 Smallwood, Cheshire, England
 Smallwood, Worcestershire, England
 Smallwood, New York, USA
 Smallwood Township, Jasper County, Illinois
 Smallwood Reservoir, Labrador, Canada
 Fort Smallwood Park, Maryland, USA

Other
 Marrina Smallwood, fictional character in the Marvel Universe
 Smallwood, Reynolds, Stewart, Stewart, Architecture Firm, Atlanta, Branded as Smallwood

See also
 Dink Smallwood, computer role-playing game
 Littlewood, a surname and a list of people with the name